Sara Mortensen, (born 10 December 1979) is a French-Norwegian actress.

She has also appeared in the recurring lead role of Captain Emma Thélier, in the police TV series Les Mystères de..., as well as in several other series and numerous TV movies and films.

Early life and education 
Sara Mortensen was born on 10 December 1979 in Paris to a plastic artist father and Elisabeth Mortensen, a Norwegian actress, theater teacher and director. She is fluent in French, Norwegian, and English. After attending the Ecole International Bilingue and a year of hypokhâgne, she obtained a master's degree in history. She joined the Cours Florent drama school from 2001 to 2004 and directed a short film: Facteur chance.

Acting career 
Sara Mortensen is a theater, television and film actress. She appeared in the series: Engrenages, Femmes de loi (2008), Joséphine, ange gardien (2014), Clem (2015) and in the movies 15 ans et demi (2008), Un homme et son chien (2009), 30° Couleur (2012), Les Trois Frères : le retour (2014), Vicky (2015), Good Luck Algeria and L'Idéal (2016) by Frédéric Beigbeder. In 2016, she played Cindy, a cook and rock singer, in season 2 of Chefs and then Kristina in Il a déjà tes yeux. In 2017, she played a policewoman in season 2 of Contact, on TF1 then in 2018 and 2019, in the TV movies Les Mystères de la basilique (with Isabel Otero), then in Les Mystères du Bois Galant and Les Mystères de l'école de gendarmerie, on France 3, from 2018 to 2020. In June 2019, her participation in Plus belle la vie was discontinued, and she was replaced by Coralie Audret. She played Astrid Nielsen, an autistic documentalist, in the police series Astrid et Raphaëlle, with Lola Dewaere, and her mother Elisabeth Mortensen, in the role of Astrid's mother.

Personal life 
Sara Mortensen is in a relationship with Bruce Tessore who plays Nicolas Berger in Plus belle la vie, whom she met during the shooting of the series. She has a son from an earlier relationship.

Filmography

Film

Cinéma 
 2008: 15 ans et demi de François Desagnat et Thomas Sorriaux : Barbara
 2008: Un homme et son chien de Francis Huster
 2012: 30° Couleur de Lucien Jean-Baptiste et Philippe Larue : l'universitaire blonde
 201:  Les Trois Frères : Le Retour de Didier Bourdon, Bernard Campan et Pascal Légitimus : femme du couple Miss Moss
 2015: Good Luck Algeria de Farid Bentoumi : directrice financière équipementier
 2015: Vicky de Denis Imbert : Pauline
 2016: Et pourquoi pas? de Nicolas Fay et Blanche Pinon (court métrage) : Virginie
 2016: Il a déjà tes yeux de Lucien Jean-Baptiste : Kristina
 2016: L'Idéal de Frédéric Beigbeder
 2017: Honni soit qui mal y pense de Sarah-Laure Estragnat (court métrage) : la quatrième femme
 2017: La Deuxième Étoile de Lucien Jean-Baptiste : Brigitte, la scoring girl
 2018: Pupille de Jeanne Herry : la femme au visage émacié
2021: Déflagrations de Vanya Peirani-Vignes : Camille

Television

Series 

 2007: Paris, enquêtes criminelles - l'assistante Magalie (saison 1, épisode 7)
 2008: Engrenage - Marina Soltes (season 2, episode 2)
 2009: La vie est à nous - Elsa (7 épisodes)
 2009: Femmes de loi - Helle (saison 9, épisode 6)
 2009: Palizzi (saison 2, épisode 42)
 2011: Victor Sauvage - Isabelle (saison 1, épisode 3)
 2011: Le Jour où tout a basculé - Maud (saison 1, épisode 56)
 2012: Valérie Marauni (3 épisodes)
 2012-2019: Plus belle la vie - Coralie Blain (261 épisodes)
 2013: VDM, la série (3 épisodes)
 2015J: Joséphine, ange gardien - Amélie Spontini (saison 16, épisode 4)
 2016: Chefs - Cindy (8 épisodes)
 2017: Contact - Louise Martel (4 épisodes)
 2017: Nina  - Clara (saison 3, épisode 9)
 2017: On va s'aimer un peu, beaucoup... - Kim Rufo (saison 1, épisode 8)
 2019: Cassandre - Chloé Vannier (saison 3, épisode 3)
 2019: Astrid et Raphaëlle - Astrid Nielsen (17 épisodes)
 2020: Il a déjà tes yeux - Kristina (2 épisodes)
 2020: L'Art du crime - Estelle Domani (saison 4, épisode 2)
 2021: Crimes parfaits - Solène Guillou (saison 3, épisode 11 Sur un arbre perché)
 2022: L'Abîme – Elsa Lacaze
 2022: Tropiques criminels - Sandra Gauthier (saison 3, épisode 3)

Téléfilms 

 2010: 4 garçons dans la nuit - Hélène Caron
 2011: Ni vu, ni connu - Martine
 2013: Le Déclin de l'empire masculin - Armelle
 2018: Les Mystères de la basilique - Émilie
 2019: Les Mystères du Bois Galant - Emma Thélier
 2021: Les Mystères de l'école de gendarmerie - Emma Thélier
 2022: Le Saut du diable 2 : le Sentier des loups de Julien Seri - Gabrielle Martinot

References 

1979 births
Living people
French actresses
People from Paris
French television actresses
French stage actresses
French film actresses